First-seeded Nancy Richey defeated Lesley Turner 6–1, 6–4 in the final to win the women's singles tennis title at the 1967 Australian Championships. Margaret Smith was the seven-time defending champion but did not participate this year.

Seeds
The seeded players are listed below. Nancy Richey is the champion; others show the round in which they were eliminated.

  Nancy Richey (champion)
  Lesley Turner (finalist)
  Rosie Casals (semifinals)
  Kerry Melville (semifinals)
  Françoise Dürr (quarterfinals)
  Karen Krantzcke (third round)
  Betty Stöve (third round)
  Jan Lehane (third round)
  Judy Tegart (second round)
  Gail Sherriff (quarterfinals)
  Lorraine Robinson (quarterfinals)
  Fay Toyne (second round)

Draw

Key
 Q = Qualifier
 WC = Wild card
 LL = Lucky loser
 r = Retired

Finals

Earlier rounds

Section 1

Section 2

Section 3

Section 4

External links
 1967 Australian Championships on ITFtennis.com, the source for this draw

1967 in women's tennis
1967
1967 in Australian tennis
Women's Singles
1967 in Australian women's sport